The mountain wren-babbler (Gypsophila crassa) is a species of bird in the family Pellorneidae. It is native to the Iran Mountains of northeastern Borneo. Its natural habitats are subtropical or tropical moist lowland forest and subtropical or tropical moist montane forest.

References

Collar, N. J. & Robson, C. 2007. Family Timaliidae (Babblers)  pp. 70 – 291 in; del Hoyo, J., Elliott, A. & Christie, D.A. eds. Handbook of the Birds of the World, Vol. 12. Picathartes to Tits and Chickadees. Lynx Edicions, Barcelona.

mountain wren-babbler
Birds of East Malaysia
Endemic birds of Borneo
mountain wren-babbler
Taxonomy articles created by Polbot
Taxobox binomials not recognized by IUCN
Fauna of the Borneo montane rain forests